Prime Volleyball League (PVL), also known as RuPay Prime Volleyball League for sponsorship reasons, is a professional men's indoor volleyball league in India. The inaugural season took place in February 2022. The league is an initiative of Baseline Ventures with no involvement from Volleyball Federation of India and a rechristened version of the Pro Volleyball League which was held in February 2019. Sony Pictures Networks India is the official broadcaster of the league. RuPay is the title sponsor of the league and signed the contract for three years.

Background 
The Volleyball Federation of India (VFI) in association with the Baseline Ventures launched and conducted the inaugural season of a franchise-based indoor volleyball league called Pro Volleyball League in 2019 and Chennai Spartans won the title. Later it was discontinued in the same year after the VFI and Baseline got embroiled in a dispute and the federation terminated the 10-year contract with Baseline alleging breach of trust. In November 2020, a Madras High Court-appointed arbitrator found the termination wrongful and awarded  crore to Baseline as compensation for terminating its contract. In June 2021, Baseline Ventures joined hands with few original franchise owners from Pro Volleyball League to launch a new league called Prime Volleyball League with no involvement from VFI this time. Five of the six teams (Ahmedabad, Calicut, Chennai, Hyderabad and Kochi) from Pro Volleyball League returned to this league with two new teams (Bengaluru and Kolkata) were added.

On 14 February 2022, VFI announced the launch of Indian Volleyball League, making it the only recognised league by VFI in India.

Volleyball World has signed multiple-year contract with Prime Volleyball League. Prime Volleyball League will broadcast globally through its platform.

In October, the league announced an eighth team called the Mumbai Meteors that will be based in Mumbai to play next season. They were bought by the PhonePe owners.

Teams

Current teams 

The Prime Volleyball League encompassed eight franchises, representing cities across India. The new team for the 2023 season is the Mumbai Meteors bought by PhonePe.

Format

PVL 2022
Each team will have 12 players with the provision of a maximum of two reserve players. All teams have a salary purse of  lakhs from which they can pick their team via an auction and player draft. The auction was taken place in Kochi on 14 December 2021. Players were divided into five categories with different base prices set for each category – International, Platinum, Gold, Silver, Bronze and U-21 players. 

There are a total of 24 matches with each team plays against each other in a single round-robin format with the top 4 teams moving into the Play-Offs. The tournament was earlier scheduled to be held in Kochi but later moved to Hyderabad due to the COVID-19 pandemic in India. All the matches will be held in Hyderabad at the Gachibowli Indoor Stadium.

Tournament seasons and results

PVL season results

See also 
 Sports in India
Indian Volley League
Pro Volleyball League

References 

Volleyball competitions in India
Sport in India
Volleyball in India
Professional sports leagues in India